Jenkovce is a village and municipality in the Sobrance District in the Košice Region of east Slovakia.

History
In historical records the village was first mentioned in 1288.

Geography
The village lies at an altitude of 109 metres and covers an area of 14.853 km².
It has a population of about 430 people.

Culture
The village has a public library, and a football pitch

Genealogical resources

The records for genealogical research are available at the state archive "Statny Archiv in Presov, Slovakia"

 Roman Catholic church records (births/marriages/deaths): 1789-1899 (parish A)
 Greek catholic church records (births/marriages/deaths): 1848-1907 (parish B)
 Reformated church records (births/marriages/deaths): 1844-1897 (parish A)

See also
 List of municipalities and towns in Slovakia

External links
 
Wayback Machine
Jenkovce - Okres Sobrance - E-OBCE.sk
Obec Jenkovce
Surnames of living people in Jenkovce

Villages and municipalities in Sobrance District